Safia Farkash Gaddafi (born 2 May 1952) is the widow of former Libyan leader Muammar Gaddafi, former First Lady of Libya, incumbent Representative of Sirte, and mother of seven of Gaddafi's eight biological children.

Early life
There are two different stories about her origin. One is that Farkash is from a family from the Eastern Libyan Barasa tribe and that she was born in Bayda and was trained as a nurse.

The other story is that Farkash is from Mostar, Bosnia and Herzegovina, where she was born as "Zsófia Farkas" to Hungarian parents.

Personal life
She met Gaddafi when he was hospitalised and treated for appendicitis in 1970. She became his second wife when they married in Tripoli during the same year.

Farkash has seven biological children with Gaddafi and two adopted children:

 Saif al-Islam Gaddafi (born 25 June 1972), her eldest son, was an architect who was long-rumored to be Gaddafi's successor. He has been a spokesman to the Western world, and he has negotiated treaties with Italy and the United States. He was viewed as politically moderate, and in 2006, after criticizing his father's government, he briefly left Libya. In 2007, Gaddafi exchanged angry letters with his son regarding his son's statements admitting the Bulgarian nurses had been tortured. They later reconciled.
 Al-Saadi Gaddafi (born 25 May 1973), was a professional football player. On 22 August 2011, he was allegedly arrested by the National Liberation Army. This turned out to be incorrect. In the late evening of 22 August 2011, he spoke with members of the international press. On 30 August, a senior National Transitional Council official claimed that Al-Saadi Gaddafi had made contact to discuss the terms of his surrender, indicating also that he would wish to remain in Libya.
 Mutassim Gaddafi (18 December 1974 – 20 October 2011), Gaddafi's fourth son, was a lieutenant colonel in the Libyan Army. He later served as Libya's National Security Advisor. He was seen as a possible successor to his father, after Saif al-Islam. Mutassim was killed along with his father after the battle of Sirte.
 Hannibal Muammar Gaddafi (born 20 September 1975), was an employee of the General National Maritime Transport Company, a company that specialized in oil exports. He is most-known for his violent incidents in Europe, attacking police officers in Italy (2001), drunk driving (2004), and for assaulting his girlfriend in Paris (2005). In 2008, he was charged with assaulting two staff in Switzerland, and was imprisoned by Swiss police. The arrest created a strong standoff between Libya and Switzerland.
 Ayesha Gaddafi (born 25 December 1976), Farkash's only biological daughter, is a lawyer who joined the defense teams of executed former Iraqi leader Saddam Hussein and Iraqi journalist Muntadhar al-Zaidi. In 2006, she married a cousin of her father's, Ahmed al-Gaddafi al-Qahsi, with whom she has four children (as of 2011). Two of her children were killed by NATO airstrikes (one with her brother Saif al-Arab Gaddafi on 30 April 2011 and the other with her husband Ahmed al-Gaddafi al-Qahsi 26 July 2011). She gave birth to her fourth child in Algeria on 30 August 2011 in Algeria after the death of her husband and two children.
 Saif al-Arab Gaddafi (1982 – 30 April 2011) was appointed a military commander in the Libyan Army during the Libyan Civil War. Saif al-Arab and three of Farkash's grandchildren were reported killed by a NATO bombing in April 2011. Like the death of Hanna, this is disputed by the organizations alleged to be responsible.
 Khamis Gaddafi (27 May 1983 – 29 August 2011), her sixth son, who was serving as the commander of the Libyan Army's elite Khamis Brigade. On 30 August 2011, a spokesman for the National Transitional Council said it was "almost certain" Khamis had been killed in Tarhuna during clashes with units of the National Liberation Army.

She and Gaddafi are rumored to have adopted two children, Hanna and Milad.

 Hana Muammar Gaddafi (claimed by Gaddafi to be his adopted daughter, but most facts surrounding this claim are disputed) was apparently killed at the age of four, during the retaliatory US bombing raids in 1986. She may not have died; the adoption may have been posthumous; or he may have adopted a second daughter and given her the same name after the first one died. Following the taking by rebels of the family residence in the Bab al-Azizia compound in Tripoli, The New York Times both reported evidence (complete with photographs) of Hana's life after her declared death, when she became a doctor and worked in a Tripoli hospital. Her passport was reported as showing a birth date of 11 November 1985, making her six months old at the time of the US raid. However, a Libyan official told the Daily Telegraph that Gaddafi adopted a second daughter and named her Hana in honour of the first one who was killed.

The family's main residence was in the Bab al-Azizia military barracks, located in the southern suburbs of Tripoli.

Business and other interests
Farkash kept a low profile during the initial period of her marriage to Gaddafi; however, after the release on license of Lockerbie bomber Abdul Baset Ali al-Megrahi in 2009, she took a more public profile. She organised a party covered by the local media to celebrate the anniversary of the 1969 revolution that brought her husband to power, and in 2010 attended the graduation of female police students.

In 2008, Farkash was elected vice president to the African First Ladies Organization in a meeting of African Union leaders in Sharm al-Sheikh, even though she was not present at the meeting, and has never taken part in activities related to it.

Farkash owns airline Buraq Air, headquartered at Mittiga International Airport. Operated with the approval of her husband, even though it is a rival of the Libyan national carrier, it monopolizes the transfer of Libyan Hajj pilgrims to Mecca.

Libyan Civil War

Farkash stayed with her husband and family through the Libyan Civil War, at their home in Tripoli. After a first round of United Nations sanctions froze the overseas assets of Libya and those personally held by Gaddafi, the governments of France and the United Kingdom enabled a second round of sanctions, which froze an estimated £18Bn of state and personal assets control by Farkash. In May 2011, she gave her first press interview to CNN reporter Nima Elbagir, via mobile telephone.

As the Battle for Tripoli reached a climax in mid-August, the family were forced to abandon their fortified compound. On 27 August 2011, it was reported by the Egyptian news agency Mena that Libyan rebel fighters had seen six armoured Mercedes-Benz sedans, possibly carrying top Gaddafi regime figures, cross the border at the south-western Libyan town of Ghadames towards Algeria, which at the time was denied by the Algerian authorities. On 29 August, the Algerian government officially announced that Safia together with daughter Ayesha and sons Muhammad and Hannibal, had crossed into Algeria early on 29 August. An Algerian Foreign Ministry official said all the people in the convoy were now in Algiers, and that none of them had been named in warrants issued by the International Criminal Court for possible war crimes charges. Mourad Benmehidi, the Algerian permanent representative to the United Nations, later confirmed the details of the statement. The family had arrived at a Sahara desert entry point, in a Mercedes and a bus at 08:45. The number of people in the party was unconfirmed, but there were "many children" and they did not include Gaddafi. Resultantly the group was allowed in on humanitarian grounds, and the Algerian government had since informed the head of the Libyan National Transitional Council, who had made no official request for their return. In October 2012 they left a hideaway in Algeria to go to Oman, where they were granted political asylum.

Sanctions
The central bank of the United Arab Emirates ordered in March 2012 all banks and financial institutions in the country to freeze the accounts of Safia Farkash and other high-ranking officials of the Gaddafi regime. This order was declared in accordance with the UN Security Council's Resolution No. 1970 of 2011, addressing fifteen Libyans whose bank accounts had been frozen for their involvement in violence against the people of Libya. In April 2016, she was allowed to return to Libya by the government as part of their efforts to pacify Gaddafi loyalists.

Notes

References

1952 births
Living people
Gaddafi family
First ladies of Libya
Libyan nurses
Libyan people of Bosnia and Herzegovina descent
Libyan people of Croatian descent
Libyan people of Hungarian descent
Spouses of national leaders
Libyan emigrants to Oman
People of the First Libyan Civil War
Bayda, Libya